Events from the year 1873 in China.

Incumbents
 Tongzhi Emperor (13th year)
 Regent: Empress Dowager Cixi

Events 
 Miao Rebellion (1854–73) ends
 Dungan Revolt (1862–77)
 Panthay Rebellion
 Genocide that reduced the population of Yunnan by at least 5 million
 Tongzhi Restoration

Births 
 16 July - Cheong Yoke Choy (張郁才; 1873 – 1958) (Xinhui district, Jiangmen) philanthropist in British Malaya
 Chen Cuifen  (陳粹芬; 1873–1960) regarded as the “Forgotten revolutionary female” and "The first revolution partner" of Sun Yat-sen.

References